Cleveland Township may refer to:

Arkansas
 Cleveland Township, Fulton County, Arkansas, in Fulton County, Arkansas
 Cleveland Township, Little River County, Arkansas, in Little River County, Arkansas
 Cleveland Township, Lonoke County, Arkansas, in Lonoke County, Arkansas
 Cleveland Township, Miller County, Arkansas, in Miller County, Arkansas
 Cleveland Township, Ouachita County, Arkansas, in Ouachita County, Arkansas
 Cleveland Township, Phillips County, Arkansas, in Phillips County, Arkansas
 Cleveland Township, White County, Arkansas, in White County, Arkansas

Indiana
 Cleveland Township, Elkhart County, Indiana
 Cleveland Township, Whitley County, Indiana

Iowa
 Cleveland Township, Davis County, Iowa
 Cleveland Township, Lyon County, Iowa

Kansas
 Cleveland Township, Barton County, Kansas
 Cleveland Township, Marshall County, Kansas, in Marshall County, Kansas
 Cleveland Township, Stafford County, Kansas, in Stafford County, Kansas

Michigan
 Cleveland Township, Michigan

Minnesota
 Cleveland Township, Minnesota

Missouri
 Cleveland Township, Callaway County, Missouri

Nebraska
 Cleveland Township, Cuming County, Nebraska
 Cleveland Township, Holt County, Nebraska
 Cleveland Township, Knox County, Nebraska

North Carolina
 Cleveland Township, Johnston County, North Carolina, in Johnston County, North Carolina
 Cleveland Township, Rowan County, North Carolina

North Dakota
 Cleveland Township, Walsh County, North Dakota

Pennsylvania
 Cleveland Township, Pennsylvania

South Dakota
 Cleveland Township, Brule County, South Dakota, in Brule County, South Dakota
 Cleveland Township, Edmunds County, South Dakota, in Edmunds County, South Dakota
 Cleveland Township, Hamlin County, South Dakota, in Hamlin County, South Dakota

Township name disambiguation pages